Melica bulbosa is a species of grass known by the common name oniongrass. The common name comes from the onionlike appearance of the corm at its root; it is not related to the onions. It is native to western North America from British Columbia to the Rocky Mountains to California. It may or may not occur as far east as Texas.

Its habitat includes mountain forest and woods, open hillsides, and streambanks.

This is a rhizomatous perennial grass with a cluster of white corms at the base of the stem. The plant forms a loose cluster of stems up to a meter tall. The inflorescence is a narrow or spreading series of bullet-shaped spikelets. The spikelet is banded in purple and green.

References

External links
Jepson Manual Treatment
Photo gallery

bulbosa
Native grasses of California
Grasses of the United States
Grasses of Canada
Flora of British Columbia
Flora of the Northwestern United States
Flora of the Cascade Range
Flora of the Klamath Mountains
Flora of the Sierra Nevada (United States)
Natural history of the California chaparral and woodlands
Natural history of the California Coast Ranges
Natural history of the San Francisco Bay Area
Flora without expected TNC conservation status